Takumi Abe (阿部 巧, born May 26, 1991) is a Japanese football player for Thespakusatsu Gunma.

Club statistics
Updated to 23 February 2018.

References

External links

Profile at Thespakusatsu Gunma 

1991 births
Living people
Association football people from Tokyo
Japanese footballers
J1 League players
J2 League players
J3 League players
FC Tokyo players
Yokohama FC players
Matsumoto Yamaga FC players
Avispa Fukuoka players
Thespakusatsu Gunma players
SC Sagamihara players
Tochigi City FC players
Association football defenders